Toni Lang (born April 22, 1982 in Hutthurm) is a  German former biathlete. In 2008, he ran his first single World Cup Race. After Biathlon World Cup 2010/2011 he retired from active biathlon sports and started studying dentistry. He is the husband of biathlete Kathrin Hitzer.

Career highlights
World Cup
2009, Oberhof, Germany,  2nd at team relay (with Rösch / Greis / Peiffer)
2009, Ruhpolding,  2nd at team relay (with Rösch / Stephan / Peiffer)

References

1982 births
Living people
German male biathletes